Bolesław Romanowski (21 March 1910 – 12 August 1968) was a submarine commander of the Polish Navy during World War II.

Biography 
Bolesław Szymon Romanowski was born in Varakļāni in Livonia. In 1920 he moved with his family to Grabówno in Greater Poland. In 1929 he graduated and entered the Polish Navy Academy. He completed the submarine navigation course then the underwater weapons training. He began his career on the torpedo boat ORP Kujawiak, in 1934 he became the executive officer of this ship. One year later he was transferred to the submarine . Shortly before the start of World War II, he was transferred to the submarine .

During the Invasion of Poland the Wilk operated in Gdańsk Bay, deployed her mines then left the Polish coast, successfully passing the Danish straits (Øresund) on September 14/15, escaping from the Baltic Sea and arriving in Great Britain on September 20. Romanowski is the only Polish submarine commander to lead his vessel through the Atlantic Ocean.

During the passage of convoy PQ-15 to Murmansk, Jastrząb on 2 May 1942 was mistakenly engaged by the destroyer  and the minesweeper . She was attacked with depth charges and made to surface, there she was strafed with the loss of five crew (including British liaison officer) and six injured, including the commander. The ship was badly damaged and had to be scuttled, near . Romanowski was shot in both legs and hospitalized in Soviet Union. Then he came back to United Kingdom. In late 1942 he became commander of the submarine . He sank five ships in the Mediterranean Sea and Aegean Sea. 

After the war ended Romanowski decided to come back to Poland. In 1947 he was designated commander of the destroyer  and brought the ship to Gdynia. After his comeback he was made commander of  then of the submarine flotilla. In 1950, during the Stalin repressions he was dismissed and arrested. After the Polish October he was incorporated in the Polish Navy. Between 1957 and 1961 he served in the General Staff of the Navy before becoming the deputy commander of the Polish Naval Academy. He was transferred to the reserve due to bad health in 1964.

Bolesław Romanowski died suddenly on 12 August 1968.

Awards and decorations
 Wound Decoration (Poland)
 Virtuti Militari, Silver Cross (Poland)
 Cross of Valour (Poland) 
 Silver Cross of Merit
 Naval Medal four times
 Medal for the Oder, the Nissa and the Baltic
 Medal of Victory and Freedom 1945
 Distinguished Service Cross 
 1939–1945 Star
 Atlantic Star with France and Germany Clasp
 Africa Star
 Italy Star 
 Defence Medal 
 War Medal 1939–1945

Military promotions

Notes

References
Marek Twardowski (in Polish): "Podwodne drapieżniki" – stawiacze min typu Wilk ("Undersea predators" – Wilk class minelayers), in: Morza, Statki i Okręty nr. 3/1998, p. 23–26

External links 
 Strona internetowa Marynarki Wojennej Rzeczypospolitej Polskiej 
 Memoriał komandora Bolesława Romanowskiego na stronie findagrave.com

1910 births
1968 deaths
Polish military personnel of World War II
Recipients of the Cross of Valour (Poland)
Recipients of the Silver Cross of the Virtuti Militari
Polish submarine commanders
Recipients of the Distinguished Service Cross (United Kingdom)